Glenroe Hurling Club is one of the oldest clubs affiliated to the Gaelic Athletic Association.  It plays hurling and formerly gaelic football. It plays in competitions organized by Limerick GAA. Located in the Ballyhoura Mountains, County Limerick, Ireland, local parish teams played hurling games from long before the famine of the 1840 and local teams played before the GAA's foundation.

History
Glenroe became an affiliated club in the 1890s after the foundation of the GAA in 1884. Currently the team plays at intermediate grade. The club is twinned with Ballylanders GAA with whom its members play Gaelic Football.

Honours

Hurling
County Titles

 Limerick Intermediate Hurling Championship (0): (runner-up in 1975, 1976, 1977, 2005, 2017)
 Limerick Junior Hurling Championship (3): 1974, 1992, 2000
 Limerick Under-21 B Hurling Championship (1): 2004
 Limerick Under-21 12-a-side Hurling Championship (2): 2010, 2012

All-County Hurling Titles
Limerick Intermediate Div 3 (1): 2007

South Limerick Hurling Titles
 Intermediate Hurling Championship (2): 2008, 2012
 Junior Hurling Championship (6): 1947, 1974, 1987, 1988, 1992, 2000
 Junior B Hurling Championship (1): 1983
 Under-21 B Hurling Championship (1): 2003
 Minor A Hurling Championship (1): 1985

Football
 Limerick Senior Football Championship (0): (runner-up in 1896)

References

External links
 

Gaelic games clubs in County Limerick
Hurling clubs in County Limerick